The Insecticide Resistance Action Committee (IRAC) was formed in 1984 and works as a specialist technical group of the industry association CropLife to be able to provide a coordinated industry response to prevent or delay the development of insecticide resistance in insect and mite pests. IRAC strives to facilitate communication and education on insecticide and traits resistance as well as to promote the development and facilitate the implementation of insecticide resistance management strategies.

IRAC is recognised by the Food and Agriculture Organization (FAO) and the World Health Organization (WHO) of the United Nations as an advisory body on matters pertaining to insecticide resistance.

pesticideresistance.org is a database financed by IRAC, US Department of Agriculture, and others.

Sponsors
IRAC's sponsors are:
Adama Agricultural Solutions
BASF
Bayer CropScience
Cheminova
Dow AgroSciences
DuPont
FMC Corporation
Monsanto
Nihon Nōyaku
Nufarm
Sumitomo Chemical
Syngenta
Vestergaard Frandsen

Mode of action classification
IRAC published an insecticide mode of action (MoA) classification that lists the most common bioactive substances and recommends that "successive generations of a pest should not be treated with compounds from the same MoA Group".

References

External links
 http://www.irac-online.org

Biotechnology advocacy
Insecticides
Organizations established in 1984
Pesticide organizations